Miguel Marín may refer to:

 José Miguel Marín (1945–1991), Argentine footballer
 Miguel José Marín (born 1989), Mexican footballer
 Miguel Marín (footballer) (born 1990), Spanish footballer